The Bofors 15.2 cm M/12 naval gun was a weapon used as the secondary armament of the Swedish s. It was designed and built by Bofors a few years before the First World War.

Bibliography

External links
 Tony DiGiulian, Sweden 15.2 cm/50 (6") Model 1912

 

Bofors
Naval guns of Sweden
Artillery of Sweden
World War II naval weapons
152 mm artillery